Kamarcheh (also known as Kamarcheh-ye Şamad Khān) is a village in Jannatabad Rural District, Salehabad County, Razavi Khorasan Province, Iran. At the 2006 census, its population was 139, in 29 families.

References 

Populated places in   Torbat-e Jam County